The  is awarded to comics authors at the Angoulême International Comics Festival. It rewards the best comic book for a 7 or 8 year old targeted public. It was first awarded in 1987 and 1988 as the "".

1980s
 1987:  by Tito, Bayard
 1988:  by Gine and Didier Convard, Le Lombard
 (1989: no award in this category)

1990s
 (1990: no award in this category)
 (1991: no award in this category)
 (1992: no award in this category)
 (1993: no award in this category)
 (1994: no award in this category)
 (1995: no award in this category)
 (1996: no award in this category)
 (1997: no award in this category)
 (1998: no award in this category)
 (1999: no award in this category)

2000s
 2000:  by Chicault, Delcourt
 2001:  by Filippi and Revel, Delcourt
 2002:  by Douyé, Goupil and Madaule, Casterman
 2003:  by Olivier Schwartz and Jean-Louis Fonteneau, Bayard
 2004:  by Joann Sfar
 2004 (joint winner):  by David Chauvel and Fred Simon, Delcourt
 2005:  by Dutto, Soleil
 2006:  by Derib and Job, Le Lombard
 2007:  by Mike Bullock and Jack Lawrence

Children's literary awards
Angoulême International Comics Festival

fr:Prix jeunesse 7-8 ans